Sunshine Queens FC is a women's association football club in Nigeria. They play in the topmost division of female football in the NWFL Premiership. Their home stadium is Akure Township Stadium. The club is one of the running football activities of Ondo State Football Agency.

History 
The club was founded in 2005. The nickname of the club, Owena Mermaid was evidently gotten from a prominent river within the state.

Current squad

<small>Squad list for 2022 season.

Staff
 Sunshine Queens F.C President: Akinsola Elvis Akinbobola
 Sunshine Queens F.C. Vice President : Lateef Fabunmi
 Head of Technical: Prince Moruf Adams
 Head of media: Wahab Bankole 
 Head of administration: Richard Aina
 Head of Marketing: Ife Adewunmi
 Technical Director: Paul Ashworth
 Assistant Technical Director: Henry Abiodun
 Players Management: Yussuf Aminu

Honours 
 Nigerian Women's Cup - 2015 winner

References

External links
 Official website

Women's football clubs in Nigeria
Association football clubs established in 2005
Nigeria Women Premier League clubs
Akure
2005 establishments in Nigeria
NWFL Premiership clubs